Peter Kumančík (born 21 July 1985) is a Slovak football defender who recently played for the Fortuna Liga club Spartak Myjava.

Club career
He made his professional debut for Spartak Myjava senior side on 2 March 2013 in the Corgoň Liga match against AS Trenčín.

External links
Eurofotbal profile
Corgoň Liga profile

References

1985 births
Living people
Slovak footballers
Association football defenders
Spartak Myjava players
Slovak Super Liga players